Angels have appeared in works of art since early Christian art, and they have been a popular subject for Byzantine and European paintings and sculpture.

Normally given wings in art, angels are usually intended, in both Christian and Islamic art, to be beautiful, though several depictions go for more awesome or frightening attributes, notably in the depiction of the living creatures (which have bestial characteristics), ophanim (which are unanthropomorphic wheels) and cherubim (which have mosaic features); As a matter of theology, they are spiritual beings who do not eat or excrete and are genderless. Many angels in art may appear to the modern eye to be gendered as either male or female by their dress or actions, but until the 19th century, even the most female looking will normally lack breasts, and the figures should normally be considered as genderless. In 19th-century art, especially funerary art, this traditional convention is sometimes abandoned.

Christian art

In the Early Church
Specific ideas regarding how to portray angels began to develop in the early Church. Since angels are defined as pure spirits, the lack of a defined form has allowed artists wide latitude for creativity. Daniel 8:15 describes Gabriel as appearing in the "likeness of man" and in Daniel 9:21 he is referred to as "the man Gabriel." Such anthropomorphic descriptions of an angel are consistent with previous descriptions of angels, as in Genesis 19:5. They were usually depicted in the form of young men.

The earliest known Christian image of an angel, in the Cubicolo dell'Annunziazione in the Catacomb of Priscilla, which is dated to the middle of the third century, is a depiction of the Annunciation in which Gabriel is portrayed without wings. Representations of angels on sarcophagi and on objects such as lamps and reliquaries of that period also show them without wings, as for example the angel in the Sacrifice of Isaac scene in the Sarcophagus of Junius Bassus.

In a third-century fresco of the Hebrew children in the furnace, in the cemetery of St. Priscilla, a dove takes the place of the angel, while a fourth-century representation of the same subject, in the coemeterium majus, substitutes the Hand of God for the heavenly messenger.

The earliest known representation of angels with wings is on what is called the Prince's Sarcophagus, discovered at Sarigüzel, near Istanbul, in the 1930s, and attributed to the time of Theodosius I (379-395). Flying winged angels, very often in pairs flanking a central figure or subject, are derivations in visual terms from pairs of winged Victories in classical art.

In this same period, Saint John Chrysostom explained the significance of angels' wings: "They manifest a nature's sublimity. That is why Gabriel is represented with wings. Not that angels have wings, but that you may know that they leave the heights and the most elevated dwelling to approach human nature. Accordingly, the wings attributed to these powers have no other meaning than to indicate the sublimity of their nature."

From then on Christian art generally represented angels with wings, as in the cycle of mosaics in the Basilica di Santa Maria Maggiore (432–440). Multi-winged angels, often with only their face and wings showing, drawn from the higher grades of angels, especially cherubim and seraphim, are derived from Persian art, and are usually shown only in heavenly contexts, as opposed to performing tasks on Earth. They often appear in the pendentives of domes or semi-domes of churches.

Byzantine art

Angels appear in Byzantine art in mosaics and icons. Artists found some of their inspiration from winged Greek figures such as "Victory". They also drew from imperial iconography. Court eunuchs could rise to positions of authority in the Empire. They performed ceremonial functions and served as trusted messengers. Amelia R. Brown points out that legislation under Justinian indicates that many of them came from the Caucasus, having light eyes, hair, and skin, as well as the "comely features and fine bodies" desired by slave traders. Those "castrated in childhood developed a distinctive skeletal structure, lacked full masculine musculature, body hair and beards,...." As officials, they would wear a white tunic decorated with gold. Brown suggests that  "Byzantine artists drew, consciously or not, on this iconography of the court eunuch".

Daniel 10: 5–6 describes an angel as clothed in linen and girt with gold. Angels, especially the archangel Michael, who were depicted as military-style agents of God, came to be shown wearing Late Antique military uniform. This could be either the normal military dress, with a tunic to about the knees, armour breastplate and pteruges, but also often the specific dress of the bodyguard of the Byzantine Emperor, with a long tunic and the loros, a long gold and jewelled pallium restricted to the Imperial family and their closest guards, and in icons to archangels. The basic military dress it is still worn in pictures into the Baroque period and beyond in the West, and up to the present day in Eastern Orthodox icons. Other angels came to be conventionally depicted in long robes.

Medieval art
Medieval depictions of angels borrow from the Byzantine. In the French Hours of Anne of Brittany, Gabriel wears a dalmatic. In the later Middle Ages they often wear the vestments of a deacon, a cope over a dalmatic, especially Gabriel in Annunciation scenes - for example The Annunciation by Jan van Eyck. This indicated that, for all their powers, they could not perform the Eucharist, and were in this respect outranked by every priest, reinforcing the prestige of the clergy.  In Early Christian art white robes were almost invariably adopted, sometimes bound with the "golden girdle" of Revelation. During the mediæval period senior angels were often clad in every brilliant colour, while junior ranks wore white. Early Renaissance painters such as Jan van Eyck and Fra Angelico painted angels with multi-colored wings.  Depictions of angels came to combine medieval notions of beauty with feminine ideals of grace and beauty, as in da Panicale's 1435 Baptism of Christ.

Renaissance art

The classical erotes or putto re-appeared in art during the Italian Renaissance in both religious and mythological art, and is often known in English as a cherub, the singular of cherubim, actually one of the higher ranks in the Christian angelic hierarchy.  They normally appear in groups and are generally given wings in religious art, and are sometimes represented as just a winged head.  They generally are just in attendance, except that they may be amusing Christ or John the Baptist as infants in scenes of the Holy Family.

Victorian art
In the late 19th century artists' model Jane Burden Morris came to embody an ideal of beauty for Pre-Raphaelite painters. With the use of her long dark hair and features made somewhat more androgynous, they created a prototype Victorian angel which would appear in paintings and stained glass windows. Roger Homan notes that Edward Burne-Jones and others used her image often and in different ways, creating a new type of angel.

Islamic art 
 Angels in Islamic art often appear in illustrated manuscripts of Muhammad's life. Other common depictions of angels in Islamic art include angels with Adam and Eve in the garden of Eden, angels discerning the saved from the damned on the Day of Judgement, and angels as a repeating motif in borders or textiles. Islamic depictions of angels resemble winged Christian angels, although Islamic angels are typically shown with multicolored wings. Angels, such as the archangel Gabriel, are typically depicted as masculine, which is consistent with God's rejection of feminine depictions of angels in several verses of Quran. Nevertheless, later depictions of angels in Islamic art are more feminine and androgynous.

Angels in manuscripts 
The 13th century book Ajā'ib al-makhlūqāt wa gharā'ib al-mawjūdāt (The Wonders of Creation) by Zakariya al-Qazwini describes Islamic angelology, and is often illustrated with many images of angels. The angels are typically depicted with bright, vivid colors, giving them unusual liveliness and other-worldly translucence. While some angels are referred to as "Guardians of the Kingdom of God," others are associated with hell. An undated manuscript of The Wonders of Creation from the Bavarian State Library in Munich includes depictions of angels both alone and alongside humans and animals. Angels are also illustrated in Timurid and Ottoman manuscripts, such as The Timurid Book of the Prophet Muhammad’s Ascension and the Siyer-i Nebi.

Angels in heaven and hell

The Qur’an makes multiple references to angels. These angels take on both active and passive roles in Quranic stories. In the story of the creation of Adam, God announces to the angels that he intends to create man. The angels act as witnesses to this announcement and subsequent creation of Adam. Although there are many versions of the story, Islamic sources relate that God used the creation of Adam as a punishment or test for the angels. Therefore, the role of angels is often described as in opposition to man.

Another angel-like creature mentioned in the Qu’ran (4:97, 32:11) is the zabāniya. A zabāniya is a black angel of hell that brings souls of sinners down to hell to punish them and can be seen in illustrations of The Timurid Book of the Prophet Muhammad’s Ascension (c. 1436 A.D.). There are nineteen zabāniya, led by Mālik, an angel considered to be the master of fire or the gatekeeper of hell. Mālik's and zabāniya's categorizations as angels are debated as some believe they are better described as spirits or demons. Actually, portrayal of Zabaniyya shares many traits characteristical for demons in Islamic arts. As seen in The Timurid Book of the Prophet Muhammad’s Ascension, Muhammad is greeted by Mālik and later witnesses the torture of sinners carried out by the zabāniya.

Similar, the fallen angel Iblis is shown during his moment of refusal to prostrate himself before the newly created Adam, leading to his banishment to the bottom of hell. He is depict as black skinned monstrous creature with horns and flaming eyes, in contrast to the presentation of the noble angels. Only his wings remain as a sign of his former angelic status, however with burned edges.

Angels associated with Muhammad
Although depictions of Muhammad are often forbidden, the few that exist often include images of angels. Specifically, the Archangel Gabriel is frequently shown alongside Muhammad. For example, in The Timurid Book of the Prophet Muhammad’s Ascension, the Archangel Gabriel appears to Muhammad in Mecca to announce his ascension. Kneeling before Muhammad, Gabriel is shown with colorful wings and a crown. Later in The Timurid Book, Muhammad is shown with Gabriel meeting a group of angels in heaven. In the Jami' al-tawarikh, a Persian history from the 14th century, Muhammad is depicted beside al-Buraq, whose tail is transformed into an angel, while two other angels approach. A 16th-century Ottoman manuscript of Siyer-i Nebi, a Turkish epic about the life of Muhammad, also includes many depictions of Muhammad alongside angels.

Gallery of angels in Christian art

Gallery of angels in Islamic art

See also

 Archangel Michael in Christian art
 Michael (archangel)
 Gabriel
 Angels in Islam
 Angelus
 Fleur de lys
 List of films about angels
 List of names referring to El
 Seraph

Notes

References

 
Christian art
Islamic art